Chiquitos Province is one of the fifteen provinces of the Bolivian Santa Cruz Department, situated in the center of the department. Its capital is San José de Chiquitos.

The province was created on January 23, 1826, during the presidency of marshal Antonio José de Sucre.

It forms the so-called "Gran Chiquitania" together with José Miguel de Velasco Province, Ñuflo de Chávez Province, Ángel Sandoval Province, and Germán Busch Province.

Location 
Chiquitos Province is located between 17° 00' and 18° 37' South and between 58° 54' and 62° 45' West. It extends over 500 km from West to East, and up to 220 km from North to South.

The province is situated in the Bolivian lowlands and borders Ñuflo de Chávez Province in the northwest, Andrés Ibáñez Province in the west, Cordillera Province in the south, Germán Busch Province in the southeast, Ángel Sandoval Province in the east, and José Miguel de Velasco Province in the north.

Division 
Chiquitos Province comprises three municipalities which are further subdivided into cantons.

Population 
The population of Chiquitos Province has increased by circa 15% over the recent five years, from 59,754 inhabitants (2001 census) to 68,445 inhabitants (2005 est.). A substantial part of the population consists of German speaking Mennonites from Russia.

Environment 
Increased agricultural use of the land has led to deforestation in the area.

Places of interest 
 Kaa-Iya del Gran Chaco National Park and Integrated Management Natural Area
 Tucavaca Valley Municipal Reserve

Gallery

References

External links 
General map of province
Detailed map of province towns and rivers
Population data (Spanish)
Social data (Spanish)

Provinces of Santa Cruz Department (Bolivia)